Golgi may refer to:
Camillo Golgi (1843–1926), Italian physician and scientist after whom the following terms are named: 
Golgi apparatus (also called the Golgi body, Golgi complex, or dictyosome), an organelle in a eukaryotic cell
Golgi tendon organ, a proprioceptive sensory receptor organ
Golgi's method or Golgi stain, a nervous tissue staining technique
Golgi alpha-mannosidase II, an enzyme
Golgi cell, a type of interneuron found in the cerebellum
Golgi I, a nerve cell with a long axon
Golgi II, a nerve cell with a short or no axon
Golgi (crater), a lunar impact crater
Córteno Golgi, an Italian village